Air Moldova is airline of Moldova headquartered in Chișinău. It mainly operates scheduled and charter services to destinations within Europe from its base at Chișinău International Airport.

History

The roots of Moldavian civil aviation

The origin of Air Moldova can be traced to 19 September 1944, when the first unit of Po-2 transport aircraft arrived in Chișinău  and the Moldovan Independent Squadron was established. Aside from fifteen aircraft Po-2 biplanes operating domestic flights and serving in the agricultural role, there were also two Li-2 aircraft, used on flights to Moscow, some Ukrainian cities and to Black Sea and Caucasus summer resorts.

In the 1960s, considerable steps were made in the development of the local Moldovan airline industry. A new airport in Chișinău able to accommodate gas turbine aircraft was opened early in the decade. The enterprise received status of Ministry of Civil Aviation in 1965 and new Antonov An-10, An-12 and An-24 aircraft expanded its fleet. Regular flights to many cities in the USSR were begun, and the transportation of fruits and vegetables grown in Moldova to the largest industrial centers of the USSR was established.

The beginning of the 1970s was marked by the appearance of jet aircraft on Moldova's main air routes. The first Tupolev Tu-134 twin-jet airliner began service in Moldova in 1971 and became the main aircraft type of the enterprise, increasing in number until at one point 26 of them were in use. In Chișinău there was even an all-union test basis for aircraft of this type.

The fleet was further enlarged in 1972 with the Yakovlev Yak-42 tri-jet regional aircraft and in 1974 with the An-26 turboprop cargo aircraft. The route map kept expanding and the flow of traffic kept growing throughout the decade. In the middle of the 1980s, Moldovan operations received ten larger Tupolev Tu-154 tri-jet airliners, furthering the development of Moldovan aviation. At that time Moldovan aircraft flew to 73 cities in the USSR and carried over 1,000,000 passengers per year. In 1990 the first international route between Chișinău and Frankfurt was opened.

Creation of Air Moldova
The airline was created in 1993 on the basis of the local Aeroflot unit. Since its very start, the company's efforts were targeted at integration to the international market and compliance with the modern standards and requirements to high-end airlines. Air Moldova joined the management team improvement program in 1999.

On 13 July 2004, Air Moldova became an International Air Transport Association member. Air Moldova has also passed the operation safety audit and received the IOSA operator certificate. In May 2006, Air Moldova implemented e-ticketing on all its flights. The Air Moldova air operators certificate permitted the transport of passengers, goods and mail as of July 2007.

In February 2015, Air Moldova ceased three routes to Bucharest, Kyiv and Sochi as the contract with Tandem Aero, which operated them on behalf of Air Moldova, was discontinued.  The Chișinău-Bucharest route relaunched on 12 December 2016.

2010s 
In October 2018, it was announced that the process of privatising Air Moldova had been completed successfully, with Civil Aviation Group (a joint venture between two Moldovan business men and the Romanian airline Blue Air) becoming its owner for the sum of 50 million MDL (2.56 million EUR). The new owners also bought the airline's debts of 1.2 billion MDL (61 million EUR).

Destinations

Air Moldova operates flights to several European, Asian, and Middle Eastern metropolitan destinations from its base at Chișinău International Airport, as well as additional seasonal and charter flights to Greece, Montenegro, Spain, and Turkey.

Codeshare agreements
Air Moldova has codeshare agreements with the following airlines (as of March 2018):
 flydubai
 LOT Polish Airlines (Star Alliance)
 S7 Airlines (Oneworld)(suspended)
 Turkish Airlines (Star Alliance)
 TAROM (SkyTeam)
 Ukraine International Airlines (suspended)
 Utair (suspended)

Fleet

Current fleet

, the Air Moldova fleet consists of the following aircraft:

Former fleet
The Air Moldova fleet previously included the following aircraft:
2 further Airbus A320 (2004-2012)
1 Airbus A321 (2014-2016, leased from Hermes Airlines)
1 Embraer ERJ 145LR (2001-2002, leased from Air Exel)
1 McDonnell Douglas MD-82 (2007, leased from Sky Wings Airlines)
3 Embraer 190LR, sold on to Eastern Airways.

Embraer signed a firm order with  Air Moldova for 2 one-class Embraer 190 regional jets. The contract included purchase rights for another aircraft. Delivery was on 10 May 2010.  A third Embraer 190 (manufactured in 2009 and previously operated by Lufthansa and Borajet) joined the fleet in 2016. All have since left the fleet.

According to some sources, Air Moldova will medium-term lease an Airbus A321, which previously operated for Small Planet Airlines. The A321 will be painted in the airline's livery and was delivered to Chișinău on 10 May 2019. It is the second Airbus A321 in the fleet, the previous was scrapped in 2017.

In any case, the Civil Aviation Group announced that the fleet will rise to 14 aircraft by 2021. Also, is planned to start long-haul routes.

In 2001, Air Moldova leased Embraer 120 and 145 aircraft. The two Yakovlev Yak-42s went back to Russia in late 2003 and 2004. The last Tupolev Tu-154B (ER-85285) was destroyed on July 5, 2006.

In November 2006, 93.1 million Moldovan lei (about €6 million) were transferred from the 2006 state budget to Air Moldova. With another 9 million lei taken from a bank, one of the six Airbus A320 has been bought. The political opposition at that time had doubts about the transparency of this deal. In June 2007, Air Moldova gave back an Airbus A320 to the lessor after 38 months of service.

An MD-82 (SX-BSQ) from SkyWings was leased for 5 months from 15 May until October 2007.

The Tupolev Tu-134 operated the Moscow and Istanbul flights more often when the second Airbus left the fleet. In the past Air Moldova chartered a Cirrus Airlines Boeing 737-500, the Moldavian Airlines Fokker 100, a Bulgarian Air VIA A320, Jet Tran Air MD81/82s and a Khors Air MD82 as a replacement. The Yak-40 replaced the Embraer EMB-120 (e.g. to Prague or Vienna) when that aircraft was in maintenance.

The first Embraer EMB 120 Brasilia was part of the fleet from 12 October 2001 until 28 September 2006 when it was transferred to Tandem Aero. The second Embraer 120RT flew between 23 April 2004 and 26 March 2005 for Air Moldova. The second Embraer EMB120 Brasilia was bought in 2006. In February 2015, Air Moldova phased out their remaining single Embraer EMB-120 which was operated on lease by Tandem Aero.

Statistics
In 2012, Air Moldova transported 506,000 passengers. In 2013, Air Moldova transported 527,000 passengers.
In 2015, Air Moldova transported 1,000,000 passengers.

See also
Aviation in Moldova
Transport in Moldova

References

External links

Airlines of Moldova
Airlines established in 1993
Former Aeroflot divisions
Moldovan brands
1993 establishments in Moldova